The Union for the New Republic (UNR), was a French political party founded on 1 October 1958 that supported Prime Minister Charles de Gaulle in the 1958 elections.

History 
The UNR won 206 of 579 seats in the November 1958 elections.

In 1962, the UNR grouped with the Gaullist Democratic Union of Labour (French: Union démocratique du travail, UDT) to form the UNR-UDT. They won 233 seats out of 482, slightly less than an absolute majority. 35 Independent Republicans boosted their support.

In 1967, UNR candidates ran under the title Union of Democrats for the Fifth Republic (Union des démocrates pour la Ve République, UD-Ve), winning 200 out of 486 seats.

The UNR was renamed Union for the Defense of the Republic in 1967, and later Union of Democrats for the Republic in 1971.

Secretaries General of the UNR 
 Roger Frey, 1958–1959
 Albin Chalandon, 1959
 Jacques Richard, 1959–1961
 Roger Dusseaulx, 1961–1962
 Louis Terrenoire, 1962
 Jacques Baumel, 1962–1967
 Robert Poujade, 1967–1969

UNR in the Senate
Under the Fifth Republic, 39 senators were affiliated to the UNR Group and 11 of them were Muslims or with Muslim origins.

 First Senate election – 37 seats; 12.0%
 Second Senate election – 32 seats; 11.7%
 Third Senate election – 30 seats; 10.9%

Maurice Bayrou was the leader of the group in the Senate from October 1962 to October 1965.

Election results

Presidential

National Assembly

See also 
 Gaullist Party

References

Defunct political parties in France
 
Political parties of the French Fifth Republic
Political parties established in 1958
1958 establishments in France
Republican parties
Political parties disestablished in 1968
1968 disestablishments in France